The 1956 World Table Tennis Championships men's singles was the 23rd edition of the men's singles championship. 

Ichiro Ogimura defeated Toshiaki Tanaka in the final, winning three sets to two to secure the title.

Results

See also
List of World Table Tennis Championships medalists

References

-